Fernando Montiel Martínez (born March 1, 1979) is a Mexican professional boxer. He is a multiple-time former world champion in three weight classes, having held the WBO flyweight title from 2001 to 2002, the WBO junior bantamweight title twice between 2002 and 2008, and the unified WBC and WBO bantamweight titles from 2010 to 2011.

Early life
Fernando Montiel is the youngest child of Manuel Montiel Sr., a former professional boxer and Fernando's current trainer. Fernando has four brothers that are former professional boxers: Eduardo Montiel, Alejandro Felix Montiel, Pedro Montiel and Manuel Montiel Jr. Fernando learned the sport of boxing in his father's gym located in Los Mochis, Sinaloa, Mexico alongside fellow boxer, Jorge "Travieso" Arce.

Regarding his nickname, Fernando has explained that one of his father's sister could not pronounce his father's name, Manuel de Jesus, when she was of younger age, so she called her brother "Cochul." The nickname was later on passed to Fernando in diminutive form, since "Cochulito" roughly translates into "Little Cochul." The nickname has no relation to a rooster, as many have argued.

Professional career

Early years at flyweight
Montiel made his professional debut on December 6, 1996, at the age of 16. He accumulated a record of 20–0–1, which included a win over future champion Cruz Carbajal, before challenging WBO Flyweight Champion Isidro García. Montiel won the bout by seventh-round TKO to become champion at age 20. He defended the Flyweight title three times against Olympic medalist Zoltan Lunka, former champion Juan Domingo Córdoba and future champion Jose "Carita" Lopez.

Super flyweight
In his next bout, Montiel moved up to the super flyweight division and defeated WBO Champion Pedro Alcázar, who died as a consequence of the blows suffered during their bout. He defended the super flyweight title against Roy Doliguez and also defeated former champion Ruben Sánchez León, but then lost the title to Mark Johnson by majority decision.

Montiel won all three of his bouts in 2004 then regained the WBO title by knocking out champion Ivan Hernández, who had recently knocked out Johnson. Montiel defended his super flyweight title against Evert Briceno (21–2) and Pramuansak Posuwan (29–0–1). In his next bout, he moved up to the bantamweight division and challenged WBO Champion Jhonny González, but lost the bout by split decision. Montiel returned to the super flyweight division and continued defending his title by defeating Z Gorres (26–1–1), Cecilio Santos (22–7–2), Luis Melendez (25–2–1), and former champion Martín Castillo (33–2–0). On May 31, 2008, in San Luis Potosí, Mexico, Montiel defeated Luis Maldonado by third-round technical knockout to successfully defend his WBO title for the eighth time. Montiel knocked Maldonado down in rounds one and three and the bout was stopped during Montiel's follow-up barrage.

Bantamweight

WBO champion
In his next match, he moved up to the bantamweight division and defeated future champion Juan Alberto Rosas. On March 28, 2009, he defeated Diego Oscar Silva (24–1–3) by third round knock out to win the Interim WBO Bantamweight title. On April 25, Montiel became a three division champion after being elevated to full Bantamweight Champion.

On September 12, 2009, Montiel faced fellow Mexican Alejandro Valdez (21–3–2) at the Palenque de la Feria in Tepic, Nayarit. The bout ended via technical draw at the 3rd round. On February 13, 2010, Montiel defeated Filipino prospect Ciso Morales (14–0) via KO at the 1st round, successfully defending his WBO Bantamweight title.

Unified WBC and WBO champion
On April 30, 2010, Montiel faced WBC Bantamweight Champion Hozumi Hasegawa in Tokyo, Japan. Montiel, who was a heavy underdog leading up to the bout, knocked out Hasegawa in the fourth round, putting an end to the Japanese fighter's 5-year title reign. With the win, Montiel unified the WBC and WBO Bantamweight titles.

On October 30, 2010, Montiel successfully defended his titles against Rafael Concepción. Montiel dropped Concepcion to the canvas twice in the second round before knocking him out in the third round.

Losing the titles to Donaire

On October 4, 2010, promoter Bob Arum announced that Fernando Montiel and Nonito Donaire are on course for a February 19, 2011 bout. Before his bout with Donaire, Fernando had a 10-round non-title bout against fellow Mexican Jovanny Soto, on December 10, 2010 in Saltillo, Coahuila. Montiel defeated Soto via KO in the second round.

On February 19, 2011, the fight against Nonito Donaire took place at the Mandalay Bay in Las Vegas, Nevada. Montiel suffered his first TKO loss in the second round.

Further setbacks
Montiel announced in the Mexican media that he would return to the ring in the super bantamweight division, as he had difficulties making the 118 pound bantamweight limit during his fight against Donaire. He rebounded with wins over future champion Nehomar Cermeno and Alvaro Perez, then faced Victor Terrazas for the vacant WBC Silver Super Bantamweight title, but was defeated by 12 round decision in what was considered an upset. 

After putting together an 8 fight winning streak, during which he moved up to the Featherweight division and secured a win over former champion Cristobal Cruz, he faced Lee Selby for the IBF World Featherweight Title but lost a 12 round decision. In his following fight, Montiel suffered a first round knockout loss to Jorge Lara.

Professional boxing record

See also
List of boxing triple champions
List of Mexican boxing world champions

References

External links

1979 births
Mexican male boxers
Bantamweight boxers
Flyweight boxers
Super-flyweight boxers
Living people
Boxers from Sinaloa
Sportspeople from Los Mochis
World Boxing Organization champions
World flyweight boxing champions
World super-flyweight boxing champions
Super-bantamweight boxers
Featherweight boxers
World Boxing Council champions
World bantamweight boxing champions